Tectitán is a municipality in the Guatemalan department of Huehuetenango. It is situated at 2,200m above sea level. It contains 9436 people. It covers a terrain of 74km2.

External links
Muni in Spanish

Municipalities of the Huehuetenango Department